Clandestinity is a diriment impediment in the canon law of the Roman Catholic Church.  It invalidates a marriage performed without the presence of three witnesses, one of whom must be a priest or a deacon.

History
It was promulgated in the 16th century by the Council of Trent in the decree called Tametsi. Prior to that time, an unwitnessed exchange of marriage vows was deplored but valid. The decree was enforced only in those regions where it could be proclaimed in the vernacular.

The witnesses must be the parish priest or another priest, with permission either from the parish priest or the local ordinary, and the other two witnesses must be capable of giving witness to the marriage vows.

It was later modified by the decree Ne Temere, to require specific priests, such as the local pastor of the couple's residence. It further stated that marriages ought to be celebrated in the parish of the bride. 

Further modifications provided that the priest was not necessary if one of the marrying parties was in danger of death or if the vows could not be exchanged before a priest in a reasonable amount of time.

See also
 Morganatic marriage
 Annulment (Catholic Church)

References

External links
 "marriage without a priest" from New Catholic Dictionary

Catholic Church legal terminology
Impediments (Catholic canon law)
Catholic matrimonial canon law
Annulment